Bauerngraben is a river of Saxony-Anhalt, Germany. It is a tributary to the Ohre, which it joins in Calvörde.

See also
List of rivers of Saxony-Anhalt

Rivers of Saxony-Anhalt
Rivers of Germany